Alyaksey Pyatrow (born 30 April 1991) is a Belarusian former professional footballer.

Honours
Shakhtyor Soligorsk
Belarusian Cup winner: 2013–14

External links
 

1991 births
Living people
Belarusian footballers
Association football forwards
FC Shakhtyor Soligorsk players
FC Volna Pinsk players
FC Dynamo Brest players
FC Isloch Minsk Raion players
FC Gorodeya players
FC Lida players
Sportspeople from Minsk Region